Dawa Dachhiri Sherpa (born November 3, 1969) is a Nepali cross-country skier and runner who has competed since 2003. Competing in three Winter Olympics, he earned his best finish of 86th in the 15 km event at Sochi in 2014.

Skiing 

At the FIS Nordic World Ski Championships 2009 in Liberec, Sherpa finished 127th in the individual sprint event while being lapped in the 30 km mixed pursuit event.

His best career finish was eighth in a 15 km event in Bulgaria in 2009.

Ultrarunning 

He previously held the record for the Ultra-Trail du Mont-Blanc, an ultramarathon held in the Alps, having completed the first edition of this race in 20h05m in 2003.

Olympic Winter Games

World Championships

References

External links
 
 

1969 births
Living people
People from Solukhumbu District
Sherpa people
Nepalese male cross-country skiers
Cross-country skiers at the 2006 Winter Olympics
Cross-country skiers at the 2010 Winter Olympics
Cross-country skiers at the 2014 Winter Olympics
Olympic cross-country skiers of Nepal
Cross-country skiers at the 2003 Asian Winter Games
Cross-country skiers at the 2007 Asian Winter Games
Male ultramarathon runners
Trail runners